The Chinese Cultural Centre Seagram Cup Stakes is a Thoroughbred horse race run annually during the last week of July/first week of August at Woodbine Racetrack in Toronto, Ontario, Canada. A Grade III event, it is open to horses Three years old and up. Raced over a distance of one and one-sixteenth miles, the race currently offers a purse of $115,065.

The Seagram Cup was inaugurated at the Old Woodbine Racetrack in 1903. A race on dirt, it was named in honor of owner/breeder Joseph E. Seagram whose Seagram Stables dominated Canadian racing at the time and who had won Canada's most prestigious race, the Queen's Plate, eight consecutive times between 1891 and 1898. With the cessation of Thoroughbred racing at Old Woodbine Racetrack, the Seagram Cup was moved to the new Woodbine Racetrack and in 1959 became a race on turf.

In 1998 the Seagram Cup reverted to being run permanently on dirt with the 2007 edition marking the first time it would be raced on the new synthetic Polytrack surface.

Over the years the Seagram Cup has been contested at various distances:
On dirt:
  miles : 1903–1924 (Old Woodbine Racetrack)
  miles : 1925-26  (Old Woodbine Racetrack)
  miles : 1928–1930  (Old Woodbine Racetrack)
  miles : 1934–1958 (Old Woodbine Racetrack), 1959–1963 and 1998 to present at Woodbine Racetrack
  miles : 1980–1981 Greenwood Raceway

On turf:
  miles : 1959–1963 (Woodbine Racetrack)
  miles : 1964–1979, 1982–1993 (Woodbine Racetrack)
  miles : 1994–1997 (Woodbine Racetrack)

Records
Speed  record:
 1:41.40 - Terremoto (1998) (at  miles on dirt)
 2:00.60 - Sky Classic (1991) (at  miles on turf)

Most wins by a jockey:
 7 - Sandy Hawley (1974, 1976, 1978, 1979, 1988, 1989, 1996)

Most wins by a trainer:
 4 - James E. Day (1986, 1988, 1989, 1991)

Most wins by an owner:
 6 - Sam-Son Farm (1986, 1988, 1989, 1991, 1996, 2014)

Winners of the Seagram Cup Stakes

Earlier winners

1954 - Verey Light
1953 - Teddy's Sister
1952 - Bulverde
1951 - McGill
1950 - McGill
1949 - No race
1948 - No race
1947 - Mugwump
1946 - No race
1945 - No race
1944 - Chance Cross
1943 - Tulachmore
1942 - No race
1941 - McMark
1940 - High Honors
1939 - Siete Colores
1938 - Storm Lass
1937 - Sun Power
1936 - No race
1935 - No race
1934 - Prince Fox
1933 - No race
1932 - No race
1931 - No race
1930 - Sandy Ford
1929 - Jollan
1928 - Sir Harry
1927 - No race
1926 - Harrovan
1925 - Edisto
1924 - Nancy Langhorne
1923 - New Hampshire
1922 - Baby Grand
1921 - Golden Sphere
1920 - No race
1919 - No race
1918 - No race
1917 - No race
1916 - Sands of Pleasure
1915 - Redland
1914 - Privet Petal
1913 - Rifle Brigade
1912 - Chepontuc
1911 - Ganogue
1910 - Ta Nun Da
1909 - Direct
1908 - Photographer
1907 - Picaroon
1906 - Moonraker
1905 - Charles Elwood
1904 - Nameoki
1903 - Easy Street

*In 1954, Queen's Own finished first but was disqualified and set back to second

See also
 List of Canadian flat horse races

Graded stakes races in Canada
Open mile category horse races
Recurring sporting events established in 1903
Woodbine Racetrack
1903 establishments in Ontario
Horse races in Ontario